This is a list of airports in Croatia, grouped by type and sorted by location.



Airport traffic

Airports 

Airport names shown in bold indicate the airport has scheduled service on commercial airlines.

See also 
 Transport in Croatia
 List of airports by ICAO code: L#LD – Croatia
 Wikipedia:WikiProject Aviation/Airline destination lists: Europe#Croatia

References
 
 
  – includes IATA codes
  – ICAO codes
  – IATA and ICAO codes

 
Croatia
Airports
Airports
Croatia